NGC 4092 is a spiral galaxy located 310 million light-years away in the constellation Coma Berenices. It was discovered by astronomer Heinrich d'Arrest on May 2, 1864. NGC 4092 is a member of the NGC 4065 Group and hosts an AGN.

See also
 List of NGC objects (4001–5000)

References

External links
 

4092
038338
Coma Berenices
Astronomical objects discovered in 1864
Spiral galaxies
NGC 4065 Group
Active galaxies
07087